Zee and Co (also known as X Y and Zee and Zee and Company) is a 1972 British drama film directed by Brian G. Hutton and starring Elizabeth Taylor, Michael Caine, and Susannah York. Released by Columbia Pictures, it was based upon a novel by Edna O'Brien. The screenplay concerns a middle-aged, bickering couple whose marriage is near its end, and the woman who comes between them.

Plot
Zee Blakely is a loud, coarse, 40-something socialite, whose marriage to her architect husband Robert is on the rocks as witnessed by their frequent verbal sparring matches. Sick of Zee's antics, Robert is drawn to quiet boutique owner Stella who is the complete antithesis to Zee in terms of personality.

Feeling bored and rejected, Zee attempts several methods to regain Robert's sympathy, such as attempting suicide, but these do not work. Zee discovers that Stella had a lesbian affair in the past, and uses this against both her and Robert and then dares him to partake in a love triangle with Stella.

Cast
 Elizabeth Taylor as Zee Blakeley
 Michael Caine as Robert Blakeley
 Susannah York as Stella
 Margaret Leighton as Gladys
 John Standing as Gordon
 Mary Larkin as Rita
 Michael Cashman as Gavin
 Gino Melvazzi as Head Waiter

Production

Filming
Zee and Co. was shot at Shepperton Studios and on location in London. The film's sets were designed by the art director Peter Mullins. Caine claimed decades later that Elizabeth Taylor was paid ten times more than he was for the film.

Music
The theme song "Going in Circles" was covered by Three Dog Night, appearing as the b-side to the single "The Family of Man" as well as on their album Seven Separate Fools, both released in 1972.

Critical reception
Critical opinions of the film were varied. Roger Ebert wrote that while the movie is "no masterpiece" it still satisfies audiences as it "unzips along at a nice, vulgar clip". He said that Elizabeth Taylor is the film's main attraction, but the emphasis upon her detracts somewhat from a fuller representation of the love triangle in the film. Steven Scheuer praised the film for its "intelligent dialogue" and as a "change of pace" for its director. Michael McWilliams cited Taylor's work as "her greatest movie performance" and called the film "outrageously funny" (McWilliams, 1987: 32).

Other critics were less sympathetic. New York Magazine wrote: "The characters played by Elizabeth Taylor, Michael Caine and Susannah York are uniformly repulsive; the style completely vulgar; the dialogue moronic, and the situations simply beyond belief in this triangular affair." Leonard Maltin wrote the film was "contrived [and] often perverse," with the Elizabeth Taylor/Susannah York love scene ranking "high in the annals of poor taste," (Maltin, 1990: 1386). Clive Hirschhorn felt the film was sabotaged by the director's "indulgent" take on it, thereby skewing Edna O'Brien's screenplay to its detriment (Hirshhorn, 1989: 298). Mick Martin offered a very brief review of the film, writing that it was a "pointless tale of sexual relationships", (Martin and Porter, 1996: p. 1213).

Home media
A Region 1 DVD-R was released by Sony Pictures on 17 December 2010.

Bibliography

References

External links

1972 films
1970s English-language films
Columbia Pictures films
1972 LGBT-related films
1972 drama films
Films directed by Brian G. Hutton
Films scored by Stanley Myers
British drama films
Films based on Irish novels
Films set in London
Films shot at Shepperton Studios
1970s British films